This is a list of awards won and nominations for Transparent, an American television series that debuted on Amazon Studios on February 6, 2014. The series stars Jeffrey Tambor.

Total nominations and awards for the cast

Significant Guild and Peer Awards

Primetime Emmy Awards

Golden Globe Awards

ADG Excellence in Production Design Awards

AFI Awards

American Cinema Editors

Artios Awards

British Academy Television Awards

California on Location Awards

Cinema Audio Society Awards

Costume Designers Guild Awards

Directors Guild of America Awards

Make-Up Artists and Hair Stylists Guild

Screen Actors Guild Awards

Producers Guild of America Awards

Writers Guild of America Awards

Significant Critical Awards

Critics' Choice Awards

*Note: There were two ceremonies held in 2016

Dorian Awards

Peabody Awards

Satellite Awards

TCA Awards

Other Awards

GLAAD Media Awards

Gotham Awards

Hollywood Music in Media Awards

NAACP Image Awards

People's Choice Awards

Women's Image Network Awards

References

Transparent
Transgender in television
Transgender-related lists